Moculescu is a Romanian surname. Notable people with the surname include:

Horia Moculescu (born 1937), Romanian pianist, composer, and producer
Stelian Moculescu (born 1950), Romanian volleyball coach and player

See also
Miculescu

Romanian-language surnames